YC Newfoundland (sometimes referred to as Youth Conference) is a Christian Youth Conference in Newfoundland, Canada, which has been hosted in Corner Brook, St. John's, and Gander in different years.

History

Past Guests

YC Malawi

Since 2004 YC in Newfoundland and Alberta has been raising money for projects helping an orphanage in Lilongwe, Malawi called the Village of Hope. YC Malawi is an event approximately two weeks in length where teams from Canada converge on Malawi to minister in a variety of settings and locations ending with a more traditional YC celebration in Silver Striker Stadium. Attendees include all ministry teams as well as international ministry guests and thousands of Malawian youth.

See also
YC Alberta

References

External links
YC Newfoundland Website
YC Malawi Website
Pentecostal Assemblies of Newfoundland and Labrador Website

Christian conferences
Christianity in Malawi
Christian organizations based in Canada
Christian music festivals
Music festivals in Newfoundland and Labrador
Youth conferences
Recurring events established in 2000